The 2014 Bassetlaw District Council election took place on 22 May 2014 to elect members of Bassetlaw District Council in England. This was on the same day as other local elections. One third of the council was up for election.

Results

Carlton

East Retford East

East Retford North

East Retford South

East Retford West

Everton

Harworth

Langold

Misterton

Tuxford and Trent

Worksop East

Worksop North

Worksop North East

Worksop North West

Worksop South

Worksop South East

References

2014 English local elections
2014
2010s in Nottinghamshire